The Joseph D. Bernard House (also known as the Bernard-Bertrand House) is a historic house located in Rayne, Louisiana in the United States. The house is the former home of the first mayor of the city of Rayne, Joseph Bernard. As one of the oldest homes in Rayne. Today, the house serves as the Rayne Cultural Center.

The house was listed on the National Register of Historic Places on June 29, 2001.

History

The house, built in 1881, is the former home of Joseph D. Bernard, co-founder and first mayor of Rayne, Louisiana, which was incorporated in 1883. The house was built on West South 1st Street. Bernard sold the house in 1918 to E.J. Bertrand, who ran the town power plant.  Around 1999, the house was threatened to be demolished. That year, it was moved to its current location to avoid demolition.

References

See also
 National Register of Historic Places listings in Acadia Parish, Louisiana

Houses on the National Register of Historic Places in Louisiana
Historic house museums in Louisiana
Houses in Acadia Parish, Louisiana
1881 establishments in Louisiana
Italianate architecture in Louisiana
Rayne, Louisiana
National Register of Historic Places in Acadia Parish, Louisiana